The Commander-in-Chief of the Royal Thai Navy, currently Admiral Choengchai Chomchoengpaet, who is headquartered in Bangkok. Prior to 1887, the Navy was divided between the Front Palace and the Grand Palace, afterward the Navies were combined to create the Royal Siamese Navy.

The following individuals have commanded the Royal Thai Navy:

Royal Siamese Navy

Two-Palace Navy (1865–1887)
 Royal Palace Navy 

 Front Palace Navy

Navy Department (1887–1910)

|-style="text-align:center;"
! colspan=6| Officer-General to the Navy

|-style="text-align:center;"
! colspan=6| Commander of the Navy Department

Ministry of the Navy (1910–1932)

Royal Thai Navy

See also
Royal Thai Navy
Head of the Royal Thai Armed Forces
Chief of Defence Forces (Thailand)
List of commanders-in-chief of the Royal Thai Army
List of commanders-in-chief of the Royal Thai Air Force

References
www.navy.mi.th

External links
 Website of the Royal Thai Navy (in Thai)

Commanders
Navy Commanders
Royal Thai Navy commanders